Jindriska Holubkova is a female former international table tennis player from Czechoslovakia.

Table tennis career
She won a gold medal in the women's team event at the 1938 World Table Tennis Championships.

See also
 List of table tennis players
 List of World Table Tennis Championships medalists

References

Czech female table tennis players
World Table Tennis Championships medalists
Living people
Year of birth missing (living people)